Aglaia mariannensis (Chamorro: mapunyao;), is a tree endemic to the Mariana Islands and Guam with large (about 10–18 cm in length) dark green, glossy pinnately compound leaves, densely arranged on stems. Terminal leaf buds are often orange and fuzzy and look like praying hands.

Axillary or terminal flowers arranged in panicles are small, yellowish green and fragrant, smelling of citronella.
The fruit is yellow or orange in color, ovoid, and contains one or two coffee-bean-sized seeds. The sparse flesh of the fruit is spongy and dry, but the fruits are dispersed by birds.

The name "aglaia" comes from the Greek language and it means "wisdom and glory".

References

mariannensis
Flora of the Mariana Islands
Plants described in 1914